An Indian Wells California Historical Landmark was erected near the Indian Wells Lodge, 4.9 miles north of Freeman Junction on Highway 14 where William L. Manly found water after his group left Death Valley.

This marker was placed by California Centennials Commission in cooperation with Kern County Historical Society and dedicated on July 9, 1950.
This site is California Historical Landmark #457.

The inscription on the plaque reads:

Indian water hole on Joseph R. Walker trail of 1834 where Manly-Jayhawker parties of 1849 found their first water after five days of travel from Argus Range. During 1860s was site of stage and freight station from Los Angeles to Coso and Cerro Gordo mines.

See also
List of California Historical Landmarks
 California Historical Landmarks in Kern County
California Historical Landmark

References

The spring is now home to the Indian Wells Brewing Co. established in 1994 by founders Rick Lovett & Greg Antonaros.  www.indianwellsbrewingco.com

Cited by founder Rick Lovett

California Historical Landmarks
History of the Mojave Desert region